Abbé Alexandre-Auguste Robineau (23 April 1747, in Paris – 13 January 1828, in Paris) was a French painter, composer, violinist, conductor, and Catholic priest. As a composer he wrote under the name Alexandre Robineau, and as a painter he painted under the name Auguste Robineau.

Life and career
Born in Paris to the engraver, painter and jeweller Jean-Charles Robineau and his wife Madeleine-Charlotte Regnier, Robineau studied music composition and the violin with Pierre Gaviniès and painting with his father in his native city. In 1754, at the age of seven, he became a choirboy at the Sainte-Chapelle where he later took holy orders. From 1762-1767 he studied music in Italy, primarily at the Conservatorio di Santa Maria di Loreto as a violin and composition pupil of Antonio Lolli.

A brilliant violinist, Robineau performed often in the Concert Spirituel, one of the first public concert series in existence, after returning to Paris in late 1767. His performances often included his own compositions, which included several violin concertos (now lost) and a few sonatas for violin and double bass which were composed in 1768. He served as the secretary of the Menus-Plaisirs du Roi from 1785 until the outbreak of the French Revolution in 1789. During this time he traveled to London where he came in contact with the Prince George of Wales (later King George IV), whom he played music and painted for.

From 1789-1792 Robineau was the conductor of the orchestra at the Théâtre-Français. He died in 1828 in Paris.  His portrait of composer Niccolò Piccinni, which for many years was housed at the Palais Garnier, is currently part of the collection at the Musée de la musique in Paris.

References

External links

1747 births
1828 deaths
Musicians from Paris
Abbés
18th-century French male classical violinists
French composers
French conductors (music)
French male conductors (music)
19th-century French Roman Catholic priests
18th-century French Roman Catholic priests